Kadysh (Qaźış) is a rural locality (a village) in Azikeyevsky Selsoviet, Beloretsky District, Bashkortostan, Russia. The population was 80 as of 2010. There are 3 streets.

Geography 
Kadysh is located 17 km southwest of Beloretsk (the district's administrative centre) by road. Aznalkino is the nearest rural locality.

References 

Rural localities in Beloretsky District